Lihyan (Liḥyān; Greek: Lechienoi), also called Dadān or Dedan was a powerful and highly organized ancient Arab kingdom that played a vital cultural and economic role in the 
north-western region of the Arabian Peninsula and used Dadanitic language. The Lihyanites ruled over a large domain from Yathrib in the south and parts of the Levant in the north. In antiquity, the Gulf of Aqaba used to be called Gulf of Lihyan. A testimony to the extensive influence that Lihyan acquired. The term "Dedanite" usually describes the earlier phase of the history of this kingdom since their capital name was Dedan, which is now called Al-'Ula oasis located in northwestern Arabia, some 110 km southwest of Teima, both cities located in modern-day Saudi Arabia, while the term "Lihyanite" describes the later phase. Dadan in its early phase was "one of the most important caravan centers in northern Arabia". It is mentioned in the Hebrew Bible. The Lihyanites later became the enemies of the Nabataeans. The Romans invaded the Nabataeans and acquired their kingdom in 106 AD. This encouraged the Lihyanites to establish an independent kingdom to manage their country. This was headed by the King Han'as, one of the former royal family, which governed Al-Hijr before the Nabataean invasion.

The Arab genealogies consider the Banu Lihyan to be Ishmaelites, Arabs descended from Ishmael, although in Jewish tradition they are thought to be descended directly from Abraham through his second wife Keturah (rather than from Ishmael).

Terminology
The term Dedan (ddn) appears in ancient texts exclusively as a toponym (name of a place), while the term Lihyan (lḥyn) appears as both a toponym and an ethnonym (name of a people). Dedan appears originally to have referred to the mountain of Jabal al-Khuraybah. In Minaic inscriptions the two terms appear together with the former indicating a place and the latter a people. Nonetheless, in modern historiography the terms are often employed with a chronological meaning, Dedan referring to the earlier period and Lihyan the later of the same civilization.

The adjectives "Dedanite" and "Lihyanite" were often used in the past for the Dadanitic language and script, but they are now most often used in an ethnic sense on analogy with the distinction between "Arab" and "Arabic".

Dadān represents a best approximation of the original pronunciation, while the more traditional spelling Dedan reflects the form found in the Hebrew Bible.

History

The primary evidence for the kingdom comes from the corpus of inscriptions in the capital Dedan and surrounding area. The dating of the rulers and dynasty is a matter of dispute and controversy in the academic sphere. No absolute chronology or even relative chronology of rulers has been established.Based on the regnal years that appear in some inscriptions of Lihyanite kings, the kingdom had minimum lifespan of 199 years. The mention of a king of Dedan in the Nabonidus Chronicle suggests that the kingdom of Lihyan cannot have come into existence before Nabonidus' arrival in northwest Arabia in 552 BC. This provides the kingdom with a floruit of 552–353 BC.

Stages
The Lihyanite kingdom went through three different stages, the early phase of Lihyan Kingdom was around the end of the 7th century BC, started as a Sheikdom of Dedan then developed into the Kingdom of Lihyan tribe. The earliest attestation of state regality, King of Lihyan, was in the mid-sixth century BC. Based on current chronological scheme and the lion tombs of Dedan, it is in the early stage of Lihyan (i.e., Dedanite period) that the Lihyanite writing system (similar to the Thamudic script, and consisting of 28 letters) emerged. initially simple in form, then evolved during later stage.

The second stage of the kingdom saw the transformation of Dedan from a mere city-state of which only influence they exerted was inside their city walls, to a kingdom that encompass much wider domain that marked the pinnacle of Lihyan civilization.

The third stage occurred during the early 3rd century BC with bursting economic activity between the south and north that made Lihyan acquire large influence suitable to its strategic position on the Caravan Road.

It appears, from recent epigraphic publications, that Lihyan controlled their trade rival Tayma (a fertile and rich oasis in North Arabia) for several generations. The hostility between the two oases is reflected by an inscription from Tayma that mention a war between them. After the Lihyanite annexation of Tayma, the Lihyanite kings may have visited the city to commemorate their rule on regular basis. Indeed, standing statues larger than human stature with legs aligned and hands hanging down, supposedly of Lihyanite kings, were found in the temple of Tayma, probably as a reminder to the population of subordination to the king of Dedan. The statues correspond with similar royal statues from Dedan, which display a standardized artistic model of dignitary sculpting. Thus suggesting the role of Dedan as a regional power. Dedan is mentioned in Harran Stele, and in Biblical accounts as an important centre of trade. Which is considered by some authors as an indicator of the existence of well organized state in the region before the mid 1st millennium BC. In the Biblical records, Dedan is mentioned alongside Tayma and Saba, but more often connected with Qedar. The kings of Lihyan were possibly the descendants of the Qedarites, and had close contacts with the Ptolemaic dynasty.

The oldest reference to Lihyan (lḥyn) comes from early Sabaean inscription dated to the first half of the sixth century BC that records the journey of a Sabaean merchant. He intended to go to Cyprus for trade, and on his way he passed through Dedan, the "cities of Judah", and Gaza.

Fall

Some authors assert that the Lihyanites fell into the hands of the Nabataeans around 65 BC upon their seizure of Hegra then marching to Tayma, and finally to their capital Dedan in 9 BC. Werner Cascel consider the Nabataean annexation of Lihyan was around 24 BC, he inferred his opinion from two factors; The first, Cascel relied on Strabo accounts of the disastrous Roman expedition on Yemen that was led by Aelius Gallus from 26 to 24 BC. Strabo made no mention of any independent polity called Lihyan. The second, is an inscription which mention the Nabataean king Aretas IV found on a tomb in Hegra (dated around 9 BC) substantiate that the territories of Lihyan was already conquered by the Nabataeans under the reign of Aretas IV. Nearly half a century later based on an inscription from certain Nabataean general who used Hegra as his HQ, mentioned the installation of Nabataean soldiers in Dedan the capital of Lihyan.

The Nabataean rule over Lihyan ended with the annexation of Nabatea by the Romans in 106 AD. Although the Romans annexed most of the Nabataean Kingdom, they did not however reach the territories of Dedan. The Roman legionaries that escorted the caravans end 10 km before Dedan, the former boundary between Lihyan and Nabatea. The Lihyanites restored their independence under the rule of Han'as ibn Tilmi, who was from the former royal family before the Nabataean invasion. His name is recorded by a craftsman who dated his tomb carving to the fifth year of Han'as ibn Tilmi reign.

Governance
The term "king of Dedan" (mlk ddn) occurs three times in surviving inscriptions, along with the phrases governor (fḥt) and lord (gbl) of Dedan. The term "king of Lihyan" (mlk lḥyn) occurs at least twenty times in Dadanitic inscriptions.

The Lihyanite kingdom was a monarchy that followed a heredity succession system. The kingdom's bureaucracy represented by the Hajbal members, similar to the people's council in our modern time, used to aid the king in his daily duties and took care of certain state affairs on behalf of the king. This public nature of the Lihyanite legal system is shared with that of south Arabia.

The Lihyanite rulers were of great importance in the Lihyanite society, as religious offerings and events were generally dated according to the years of king reign. Sometimes regnal titles were used; such as Dhi Aslan (King of the Mountains) and Dhi Manen (Robust King). Also religion played a significant role and was, along with the king, a source of legislation. Under the king there was a religious clergy headed by the Afkal, which appears to be inherently passed position. The term was borrowed by the Nabataeans directly from the Lihyanites.

Other state occupations that were recorded in Lihyanite inscriptions was the position of Salh (Salha for a female); mostly occurs before the name of the supreme Lihyanite deity Dhu-Ghabat (meaning the delegate of Dhu-Ghabat). The Salh was responsible for collecting taxes and alms from the followers of the god. Tahal (a share of the taxes) which equals one tenth of the riches was dedicated to the deities.

Post-Nabataean Lihyanite kings were less powerful in comparison to their former predecessors, as the Hajbal exercised greater influence on the state, to the point where the king was virtually a figurehead and the real power was held by the Hajbal.

Economy
Dedan was a prosperous trading centre that lay along the north–south caravan route at the northern end of the Incense Road. It hosted a community of Minaeans.

According to Ezekiel, in the 7th century Dedan traded with Tyre, exporting saddle cloths.

Religion
The Lihyanites worshipped Dhu-Ghabat and rarely turned to other deities for their needs. Other deities worshipped in their capital Dedan included the god Wadd, brought there by the Minaeans, and al-Kutba'/Aktab, who was probably related to a Babylonian deity and was perhaps introduced to the oasis by the king Nabonidus.

See also
Invasion of Banu Lahyan

References
Notes

Works cited

Further reading
Lozachmeur, H (ed.) 1995. Présence arabe dans le croissant fertile avant l'Hégire. (Actes de la table ronde internationale Paris, 13 Novembre 1993). Paris: Éditions Recherche sur les Civilisations. pp. 148. . 
Werner Caskel, Lihyan und Lihyanisch (1954)
F.V. Winnett "A Study of the Lihyanite and Thamudic Inscriptions", University of Toronto Press, Oriental Series No. 3. 
Lynn M. Hilton, Hope A. Hilton (1996) "Discovering Lehi". Cedar Fort. .

External links
http://www.mnh.si.edu/epigraphy/e_pre-islamic/lihyanite.htm

Adnanites
Arab groups
History of Saudi Arabia